Köln-Stammheim is a railway station situated at Stammheim, Cologne in western Germany. It is served by the S6 line of the Rhine-Ruhr S-Bahn at 20-minute intervals. The station is located on a bridge over the L101 Dunnwalder Kommunalweg road.

References

Rhine-Ruhr S-Bahn stations
S6 (Rhine-Ruhr S-Bahn)
Railway stations in Cologne
Railway stations in Germany opened in 1991
Mülheim, Cologne